Caspase 2  also known as CASP2 is an enzyme that, in humans, is encoded by the CASP2 gene. CASP2 orthologs have been identified in nearly all mammals for which complete genome data are available. Unique orthologs are also present in birds, lizards, lissamphibians, and teleosts.

Function 

Sequential activation of caspases plays a central role in the execution-phase of cell apoptosis. Caspases exist as inactive proenzymes that undergo proteolytic processing at conserved aspartic residues to produce two subunits, large and small, that dimerize to form the active enzyme. The proteolytic cleavage of this protein is induced by a variety of apoptotic stimuli.

Caspase 2 proteolytically cleaves other proteins. It belongs to a family of cysteine proteases called caspases that cleave proteins only at an amino acid following an aspartic acid residue. Within this family, caspase 2 is part of the Ich-1 subfamily. It is one of the most conserved caspases in different species of animal. Caspase 2 has a similar amino acid sequence to initiator caspases, including caspase 1, caspase 4, caspase 5, and caspase 9. It is produced as a zymogen, which contains a long pro-domain that is similar to that of caspase 9 and contains a protein interaction domain known as a CARD domain. Pro-caspase-2 contains two subunits, p19 and p12.

It has been shown to associate with several proteins involved in apoptosis using its CARD domain, including RIP-associated Ich-1/Ced-3-homologue protein with a death domain (RAIDD), apoptosis repressor with caspase recruitment domain (ARC), and death effector filament-forming Ced-4-like apoptosis protein (DEFCAP). Together with RAIDD and p53-induced protein with a death domain ([PIDD])(LRDD), caspase 2 has been shown to form the so-called PIDDosome, which may serve as an activation platform for the protease, although it may also be activated in the absence of PIDD. Overall, caspase 2 appears to be a very versatile caspase with multiple functions beyond cell death induction.

Interactions 

Caspase 2 has been shown to interact with:
 BH3 interacting domain death agonist,
 CRADD, and
 Caspase 8.

See also 
 The Proteolysis Map
 Caspase

References

External links 
 The MEROPS online database for peptidases and their inhibitors: C14.006
 

EC 3.4.22
Caspases